22 Scorpii (i Scorpii) is a single star in the southern zodiac constellation of Scorpius, about one degree from Antares. It is faintly visible to the naked eye with an apparent visual magnitude of 4.78. The star is embedded in, or adjacent to, the diffuse nebulous cloud IC 4605 located in the western regions of the Rho Ophiuchi cloud complex.

22 Scorpii is a B-type main-sequence star with a stellar classification of B3 V. It is ten million years old and has a high rate of spin with a projected rotational velocity of 169 km/s.

References

External links

B-type main-sequence stars
Scorpius (constellation)
Scorpii, i
Durchmusterung objects
Scorpii, 22
148605
080815
6141